Annie Chen Ting-ni (born 28 April 1989) is a Taiwanese actress, host and model.

She was the first person to win at the Kaiwo Phantasy Star Catwalk Girl modeling contest in 2007. A year later, she made her acting debut in Prince + Princess 2, playing the lead role Zhao Ke Rou.

Early life
Chen was born on 28 April 1989, in Taichung, Taiwan. She is an only child. Chen has stated in interviews that she was conceived through in vitro fertilization because her parents had a difficult time conceiving a child naturally. Her father owned a wholesale frozen poultry business in Taichung that went bankrupt in 2010 due to the bird flu virus outbreak that year in Taiwan. She attended Viator Catholic High School (衛道中學) for junior high school and graduated from Shin Min High School (新民高中). She studied finance at Kainan University and began to work during her senior year. She then moved to Hsing Wu University of Science and Technology, Department of Finance, where she applied for leave because of her work.

Career

2007−2008: Modeling and acting debut
During her post-secondary years, she joined a modeling competition where she won the championship title at The First Kaiwo "Phantasy Star" CatwalkGirl contest in 2007. The selection process was between June 18 to August 18 of 2007. After winning, she began to work at the Catwalk Production House and get more opportunities, which includes being an MTV Taiwan VJ host, advertising endorser of various products, and a well-known magazine cover model.

In 2008, she gets her first recognition as an actress after starring in Judy Chou's music video, who came a runner-up in the One Million Star singing competition. Subsequently, she starred on her first acting career in CTS' Prince + Princess 2 as the female lead, Zhao Kerou.

2009−2011: Television series
In 2009, she starred in Will Pan's song entitled "Silence Room for Rent" (寂屋出租) included in his 007 album. She was also cast in CTV's Momo Love as Zhang Kaili, Chen Qi's (Ken Chu) girlfriend.

Chen got her second and third leading roles in a television series during 2010. One is Happy and Love Forever (幸福一定强), the first series of Happy of the Rings trilogy of Anhui TV, with Ming Dao and Li Yi Feng. She played the character of Pan Xiao Nuo, a girl who coincidentally met Yin Ding Qiang after her ex-boyfriend's betrayal towards her. The next series is CTS' Volleyball Lover with Godfrey Gao. She portrayed the role of Xin Haijing, Bai Qian Rui's childhood friend and a volleyball player. In addition, Chen also starred in Life Drama Exhibition Public Television's Goodbye (再見全壘打) as Zhao Zhong Ci.

Chen, along with Ming Dao, guest starred in the second series of Happy of the Rings trilogy entitled Sunny Happiness in 2011, continuing her relationship with Yin Ding Qiang, now as a wife. She, then, played a supporting role in CTS' Material Queen as Sa Xia.

At the end of the year 2011, Chen was cast as the main female lead of SETTV television series' Inborn Pair as Song Yi Jie.

2012−2013: Love Now and Love Around
For the third time, Chen and Dao portrayed their roles in Happy and Love Forever as a loving couple, and acted along with Mike He and Janine Chang, the casts of Sunny Happiness, in the third and last series of Happy of the Rings trilogy entitled Happy Michelin Kitchen.

After Chen's successful drama with Chris Wang on Inborn Pair in 2012, she started filming Love, Now in Boracay, Philippines with her new leading man, George Hu. Chen plays the character of Yang Yi-ru, a workaholic person who went on vacation and coincidentally meets Lan Shi-de. The series was successful as both the drama and Chen's pairing with George Hu received positive reviews.

Right after their successful team-up on March 5, 2013, Chen and Hu paired up once again on their new television series, Love Around starting on June 9, 2013. SETTV. All 21 episodes of the drama remained number one in its time slot throughout its airing.

2014−present
Chen started 2014 mainly concentrating on modeling work. In February, during early develops she turned down the lead role for SETTV drama Love Met Cupid in order to let her contract with Sanlih E-Television expire and not renew it. The drama  would later become Pleasantly Surprised, which became a hit.

After taking almost a year hiatus from acting she returned to the small screen in late 2014 with the TVBS drama Boysitter. The drama is about a single unwed mother played by Chen who has to decide if she will take back her irresponsible ex-boyfriend and father of her child played by River Huang or be with her more mature and reliable co-worker played by Melvin Sia.

In 2016, she acted in the Taiwanese film White Lies, Black Lies.

Personal life
In January 2022, Chen and actor George Hu announced their engagement on Instagram. The couple had worked together on the 2012 television series Love, Now and the 2013 drama Love Around.

Filmography

Television series

Film

Music video appearances

Awards and nominations

References

External links

 
 
 

1989 births
Living people
21st-century Taiwanese actresses
Actresses from Taichung
Taiwanese female models
Taiwanese film actresses
Taiwanese television actresses